Evanston station could refer to the following:

 Evanston railway station, a railway station in Adelaide, South Australia, Australia
 Three current commuter rail stations in Evanston, Illinois, United States:
 Evanston Central Street station
 Evanston Davis Street station
 Evanston Main Street station
 Evanston station (Wyoming), a former railway station in Evanston, Wyoming, United States